Safed Sanjak was a sanjak (district) of Damascus Eyalet (Ottoman province of Damascus) in 1517–1660, after which it became part of the Sidon Eyalet (Ottoman province of Sidon). The sanjak was centered in Safed and spanned the Galilee, Jabal Amil and the coastal cities of Acre and Tyre. The city of Safed was made up of Muslim and Jewish townspeople, while the rest of the sanjak was populated by Sunni Muslims, Jewish peasants, Bedouin tribesmen, Shia Muslims and Druze peasants.

Territory and demographics
The territory of Safed Sanjak consisted of the area between the Zahrani River in the north to Mount Carmel (near Haifa) in the south, and the area between the Sea of Galilee in the east and the Mediterranean Sea to the west. Besides Safed, it included the port cities of Acre and Tyre and the entire Galilee and Jabal Amil area. The district had a mixed population of peasants and Bedouin. The inhabitants of the Jabal Amil region were predominantly Shia Muslims, while the Galilee had a Sunni Muslim majority, including peasants and Bedouin, and a large Druze minority. The district also contained Jewish communities.

Administrative divisions
In the 16th century, the Safed Sanjak was divided into the following five nawahi (singular: nahiya; third-level administrative subdivisions) and a'mal (singular: amal; fourth-level administrative subdivisions):
Nahiya of Jira — It roughly corresponded with the eastern Upper Galilee, surrounding the city of Safed. The name Jīra is likely a derivative of jār, Arabic for "neighbor", and the nahiya was previously known al-Zunnār, Arabic for "belt" because it surrounded Safed.
Amal of Barr Safad
Nahiya of Acre — It roughly corresponded with the western Upper Galilee.
Amal of Acre
Amal of Shaghur
Amal of Buqei'a
Nahiya of Tiberias — It roughly corresponded with the Lower Galilee, and part of the boundary separating it from the nahiya of Jira was the Wadi al-Rubudiyeh (Zalmon) stream.
Amal of Tiberias
Amal of Nazareth
Amal of Marj Bani Amir — The amal included only part of the Jezreel Valley, the remaining part belonging to the Iqta of Turabay, which later became Lajjun Sanjak.
Amal of Kafr Kanna
Nahiya of Tibnin — It roughly corresponded with southeastern Jabal Amil and was alternatively called Bilad Bani Bishara. Bishara may have been an Ayyyubid officer who was granted the area as an iqta by Sultan Saladin, although Mamluk sources suggest the Banu Bishara were a Shia Muslim tribe which lived in the area.
Amal of Tibnin
Amal of Marjayoun
Amal of Jabal Amil
Amal of Tyre
Nahiya of Shaqif — It roughly corresponded with northeastern Jabal Amil, and the boundary separating it from the nahiya of Tibnin to the south by the Litani and Hasbani rivers.
Amal of Shaqif

There is no available information about the administrative divisions of Safed Sanjak during the 17th century. By the 18th century, Safed Sanjak was divided into ten nawahi.

History

Administrative origins and Ottoman conquest
Before Ottoman rule, Safed was the capital of its own mamlaka (province) of the Cairo-based Mamluk Sultanate. Administrative information about Mamlakat Safad derives mainly from two sources: the qadi (Islamic head judge) of Safed in the 1370s, Shams al-Din al-Uthmani, and the Mamluk historian al-Qalqashandi, who based much of his material about Mamlakat Safad on al-Uthmani's work. Most of the information about the mamlaka covers the period between 1260 and 1418, while little is known for the last century of Mamluk rule before the Ottoman conquest following the Battle of Marj Dabiq in 1516. Travelers' accounts from the 15th century describe a general decline of the region around Safed precipitated by a famine, plagues, natural disasters and political chaos, and the flight of peasants from their villages to the main towns or their adoption of nomadism. 

The Ottomans entered the territory of the mamlaka through the Daughters of Jacob Bridge and did not meet any resistance in or around Safed. They bypassed the city, setting up camps at the Daughters of Jacob's Bridge, Khan Jubb Yusuf, Khan al-Minya and Khan al-Tujjar, all located in the mamlaka, before proceeding to conquer Mamluk Egypt. While Selim I was in Egypt, rumors spread in Safed that he had been killed, spurring the townspeople to revolt against the Ottomans before being suppressed by the new authorities.

Prosperity in early to mid-sixteenth century
After its incorporation into the Ottoman Empire, Safed was reorganized into a sanjak administratively part of the Damascus Eyalet. Its jurisdiction roughly corresponded with the territory of Mamlakat Safad. Safed Sanjak prospered at least during the first sixty years of Ottoman rule, with displaced peasants returning to their villages and the town of Safed becoming a haven for Jews from Europe, who turned the town into a wool production center. The first known Ottoman land and tax survey in the sanjak was in 1525/26, followed by a second survey in 1538/39. The second survey shows substantial increases in the population and tax revenues, possibly a result of peasants returning to their villages and the stability brought by the early Ottoman rulers. In 1547-48, Safad Sanjak contained a total of 287 villages. 

In the 16th century, the Sudun clan of Qana, who were Shia Muslims of purported Circassian origins, and the Al Shukr of Aynatha, a family of Shia seyyeds (religious leaders), dominated the Bilad Bishara nahiya of the sanjak.

Ascendancy of the Druze
The initial prosperity of the sanjak waned toward the end of the 16th century and remained in general decline, more or less extending until the 19th century. The native chronicler and Hanafi mufti of Safed, al-Khalidi al-Safadi (d. 1625), indicated in his writings that the closing years of the 16th century in the sanjak were marked by devastation and desolation, which is generally reflected in Ottoman government records. 

In 1602 the Druze chieftain of the Chouf-based Ma'n dynasty and governor of Sidon-Beirut, Fakhr al-Din II, was appointed governor of Safed. Fakhr al-Din had become an increasingly powerful figure in the region and at the time enjoyed support from the Ottoman government. He was tasked in Safed with controlling the Shia Muslim clans, who were generally viewed more negatively by the Sunni Ottomans than the Druze, and like the Druze and Bedouin of the region in general, were in a frequent state of rebellion through their stockpiling of muskets and refusal to pay taxes. Three years after Fakhr al-Din's appointment, the Ottomans commended him for "guarding the country, keeping the Bedouins in check, ensuring the welfare and tranquility of the population, promoting agriculture and increasing prosperity". Khalidi, who became Fakhr al-Din's adviser and practical court historian, also testified that Bedouin brigandage along the highways of the sanjak ceased under Fakhr al-Din, resulting in peace and security, and that agriculture was thriving anew.

In 1614, a new eyalet (province) was created based in Sidon, and Safed was annexed to it. The province was disbanded later that year and Safed Sanjak reverted to Damascus Eyalet. During Fakhr al-Din's exile between 1613 and 1619, the Shia Muslim Harfush dynasty tried and failed to gain control of it. Around the same time, in 1617, the Shia Muslim clan of Munkar and the house of Ali al-Saghir emerged, along with Al Shukr, as opponents of the Ma'ns in Bilad Bishara. After a five-year exile in Tuscany, Fakhr al-Din reestablished his position in the region, his power reaching its apex in the 1630s until he was killed by imperial Ottoman troops in 1635. Ali al-Saghir and his brother Husayn, who traced their origins to an old, influential Shia Muslim tribe, eliminated the rival clans of Sudun in 1639 and Al Shukr in 1649, thereafter establishing their family as the sole leaders of the Shia Muslim clans across Jabal Amil, including the areas of Tibnin, Hunin, Qana and Ma'araka.

The settlements of the Galilee, particularly Safed and Tiberias, deteriorated during the struggle to capture the region by the nephew of Fakhr al-Din, Mulhim ibn Yunus Ma'n, who ultimately gained control of Safed Sanjak in 1653. The following year, the Ali al-Saghir clan irked the authorities for not forwarding revenues from Tyre earmarked for a waqf (religious trust) in Damascus. It may have precipitated their decline, which was advanced with the deaths of Husayn and his son Hasan in 1655 and 1656. In 1660, the Sidon Eyalet was reestablished and Safed was once again annexed to it. The Ottoman governor of the new province launched a campaign against the Shia feudal lords, resulting in the deaths of Ali and many of his sons. Less powerful Shia clans, such as the Zayn of Bint Jbeil, filled the local leadership void in the aftermath, though the Ali al-Saghir regrouped toward the end of the century and may have maintained tacit support from the Ma'n. 

Ahmad Ma'n died in 1697 without male progeny and the Ma'n tax farms in Sidon-Beirut Sanjak were transferred to Haydar Shihab by the Ottoman government. With the demise of the Ma'ns in the late 17th century, the Safad Sanjak also largely came under the control of the Shihab dynasty. The Shihabi emir, Bashir I, Haydar's uncle and the effective leader of the Shihab dynasty, launched a punitive campaign against the Ali al-Saghirs in Bilad Bishara in 1698, capturing Mushrif and his son Muhammad and transferring them to the custody of Sidon's governor Kaplan Pasha, brother of Tripoli Eyalet's governor and Shihab ally Arslan Mehmed Pasha. Bashir was afterward appointed the governor of the Safad Sanjak. He routed a coalition of the Ali al-Saghir, Sa'b and Munkar Shia clans in Nabatieh in 1707. Taking control of Bilad Bishara, he granted it to his Druze deputy Mahmud Abu Harmush.

Zaydani rule
By the late 17th century, the Bedouin Banu Saqr tribe practically dominated the area west of Tiberias between Safed and Nablus. The Saqr extended their protection to the Banu Zaydan clan under its chief, whose name is not defined in the sources. The chief's son Umar al-Zaydani was appointed the mutasallim (tax farmer) of Safed by Bashir I who also appointed his own son Mansur governor of Safad Sanjak. Mansur died in 1702 and was succeeded as governor by Umar, who held the post until his death in 1706, the same year Bashir I died in Safed. 

The governor of Sidon Eyalet, backed by local forces from Nablus, resolved to subjugate the Saqr, who had developed a reputation for raiding villages, endangering travelers and commerce, and evading taxes. In an effort to improve their position with the authorities, the Saqr invested in Umar al-Zaydani's son Zahir al-Umar to serve as their representative. With their backing, Zahir gained control of Tiberias and persuaded Sidon to appoint him its tax farmer. By 1738 he gained the surrender of Safed by its local strongman and tax farmer Muhammad Naf'i. In 1746 he added the tax farm of Acre to his domains, while he and other Zaydanis had consolidated their control over the rest of the Galilee. After twenty-five years of on and off clashes and cooperation, Zahir and the Shia Muslim clans of Jabal Amil led by Nassif al-Nassar of the Ali al-Saghir clan agreed a formal alliance making Zahir their official representative with the authorities in Sidon, overseeing their tax payments and agreeing to defend them against the Druze led by Mulhim Shihab in exchange for their military backing. 

Zahir fortified Acre and made it the capital of his expanding sheikhdom and the center of his monopoly on the cotton trade from Palestine. Acre's practical dominance of the sanjak under Zahir, who ruled until his death in 1775, and his Ottoman-appointed successors Jazzar Pasha (1775–1804), Sulayman Pasha al-Adil (1805–1819) and Abdullah Pasha (1820–1831) contributed to the political decline of Safed, which became a nahiya center with limited local influence, belonging to the Acre Sanjak.

References

Bibliography

  

States and territories established in 1516
Ottoman Galilee
History of Safed
Sanjaks of Ottoman Syria
1516 establishments in the Ottoman Empire
18th-century disestablishments in the Ottoman Empire